The Back Horn is the sixth major label album release of the Japanese rock band of the same name.  The album was released on May 23, 2007.

Track listing

Haisha no Kei (敗者の刑) – 5:34
Hello (ハロー) – 5:27
Utsukushii Namae (美しい名前) – 5:26
Fifteenth major single.
Maihime (舞姫) – 4:46
Freesia (フリージア) – 5:08
Koukai (航海) – 6:20
Niji no Kanata e (虹の彼方へ) – 5:14
Theater (シアター) – 5:12
Oubeki Kizu (負うべき傷) – 4:51
Koe (声) – 4:22
Fourteenth major single.
Risou (理想) – 5:03
Eda (枝) – 4:44

The Back Horn albums
2007 albums
Victor Entertainment albums